Mimoun, Mimun or MIMUN may refer to 
Mimoun (name)
Moscow International Model United Nations (MIMUN) in Russia
Ath Aissa Mimoun, a commune in Algeria
Ouled Mimoun, a town and commune in Algeria
Ouled Mimoun District in Algeria
Stade Mimoun Al Arsi, a stadium in Morocco